The Patagonian yellow finch (Sicalis lebruni) is a species of bird in the family Thraupidae.
It is found in Argentina and Tierra del Fuego; also Chile.
Its natural habitats are subtropical or tropical dry shrubland and temperate grassland.

Range
The Patagonian yellow finch's range is in the southern half of Argentina, both in the eastern and central regions. To the south, the range covers the northern half of Tierra del Fuego, and the contiguous areas of extreme southern Chile.

References

External links
"Patagonian Yellow-Finch" photo gallery VIREO
Photo-Medium Res; Article avesandes

Patagonian yellow finch
Birds of Patagonia
Patagonian yellow finch
Taxonomy articles created by Polbot